Witchford Village College (sometimes abbreviated to W.V.C.) is a secondary school in the village of Witchford, near Ely, Cambridgeshire, England. Before becoming an academy the school was a specialist Sports College. With approximately 820 pupils on roll, the college has fewer pupils than the national average (~950).

About the college 
Witchford Village College is situated on the edge of the village of Witchford, close to the city of Ely.

The College site provides facilities for a wide range of activity and as the school has a specialism in sport, many of them are sporting. There are teaching rooms, a large Library/Resource Centre, an Assembly Hall with Dining annex, six Science Laboratories, a Sports Halls and Gymnasium and specialist rooms for Drama, Music, Home Economics and Information and Communication Technology (ICT). In quite recent years over £3 million has been spent on building extensions at the College because of growth in student numbers. New areas include a Design and Technology area, Art and Design rooms, a Ceramics studio, a display exhibition gallery and new ICT suites.

Continued growth in demand for student places at the College has meant that an additional English teaching block containing six classrooms, new Special Needs Accommodation, an additional Laboratory and a new Art and Design room were opened.

In September 2004 a fitness studio was opened.  A major development in September 2006 was the complete upgrading of four ICT suites and the installation of Interactive Whiteboards in over 25 classrooms.

In 2011, the school became an academy.

Plans for Summer 2014 included the refurbishment of the Food Technology classrooms and new tennis courts.

Catchment area 
Witchford College serves students living predominantly in East Cambridgeshire. The catchment area of the school includes:
Aldreth
Coveney
Haddenham
Little Thetford
Mepal
Sutton
Stretham
Wardy Hill
Wilburton
Witcham
Witchford

Ofsted
An October 2016 Ofsted inspection rated the school overall as 'Good'. According to the report: 'In 2015, the college met the government’s floor standards, which set the minimum
expectations for pupils’ attainment and progress at GCSE.

Community education 
Community Education at Witchford Village College offer courses from Book-Keeping and Florsitry, to Jewellery Making and Digital Photography.

Partner schools 
Witchford Village College has one partner school, with which student exchange trips can take place. The school is as follows:
  Anna van Rijn School.

References

External links 
Official W.V.C. website
Community Education at W.V.C

Academies in Cambridgeshire
Secondary schools in Cambridgeshire